John Pemberton Plumptre (3 May 1791 – 7 January 1864) was a British politician. He was elected as a Conservative Member of Parliament for East Kent in 1832, and resigned on 29 January 1852 through appointment as Steward of the Chiltern Hundreds. He was educated at St John's College, Cambridge.

Film reference
Tom Hiddleston portrayed Plumptre in the 2007 BBC drama Miss Austen Regrets.

References

External links 
 

1791 births
1864 deaths
Alumni of St John's College, Cambridge
Conservative Party (UK) MPs for English constituencies
UK MPs 1832–1835
UK MPs 1835–1837
UK MPs 1837–1841
UK MPs 1841–1847
UK MPs 1847–1852
Tory MPs (pre-1834)